Nanpara is a constituency of the Uttar Pradesh Legislative Assembly covering the city of Nanpara in the Bahraich district of Uttar Pradesh, India.

Nanpara is one of five assembly constituencies in the Bahraich Lok Sabha constituency. Since 2008, this assembly constituency is numbered 283 amongst 403 constituencies.

Currently this seat belongs to Apna Dal's candidate Ramniwash Verma who won in last Assembly election of 2022 Uttar Pradesh Legislative Elections defeating Samajwadi Party candidate Madhuri Verma by a margin of 850 votes.

18th Vidhan Sabha: 2022 Assembly Elections

References

External links
 

Assembly constituencies of Uttar Pradesh
Politics of Bahraich district